The National Wrestling Alliance (NWA) member NWA San Francisco promoted a professional wrestling tag team championship under the name NWA World Tag Team Championship from 1950 until 1961 in and around their local territory until it closed. When San Francisco based Big Time Wrestling became a member of the NWA in 1968 they began promoting their version of the NWA World Tag Team Championship as part of their shows until the championship was abandoned in 1979. The NWA rules allowed each individual member to promote a championship under that name, which meant there were several NWA World Tag Team Championships promoted across North America at some point between 1950 and 1982, with two different versions being promoted in San Francisco, although not at the same time. At one point in 1957 no less than 13 different versions of the NWA World Tag Team Championship were recognized across the United States. At least 21 different regional branches of the NWA World Tag Team Championship have identified as being active at some point between 1950 and 1991. In 1992 the NWA Board of Directors sanctioned one main NWA World Tag Team Championship under their control. As it is a professional wrestling championship, it is not won via legitimate competition; it is instead won via a scripted ending to a match or on occasion awarded to a wrestler because of a storyline.

Ray Eckert and Hard Boiled Haggerty are recognized as the first holders of the NWA San Francisco version of the championship, said to have defeated the team of Ron Etchison and Larry Moquin, although no direct record of the match has been found; it was only mentioned on television. Due to gaps in documentation from the era not all championship changes have been record with specific dates, only the general period of time that they happened. Due to this it is impossible to say which team held the championship for the shortest period of time although it is unlikely to be shorter than the one-day reign of Mike and Ben Sharpe from January 9 to 10, 1958. The Sharpe Brothers' eighth reign lasted at least 131 days, the longest known reign of any champions. The Sharpe Brothers also hold the record for most reigns, a total of 18, 15 more than any other team. In 1957 the San Francisco version of the championship was one of thirteen NWA World Tag Team Championships being promoted in the United States throughout the NWA territories. The NWA: San Francisco version of the championship was abandoned in when promoter Joe Malcevicz closed his promotion in 1962.

In 1961 Roy Shire started a rival wrestling promotion in San Francisco called Big Time Wrestling, in direct competition with NWA: San Francisco. Shires' promotion created its own World Tag Team Championship in 1961, with Guy and Joe Brunetti as its first champions. Initially Shire was associated with the American Wrestling Alliance, but in 1968 he became a member of the NWA. At that point the Big Time Wrestling tag team championship was given the NWA suffix. Big Time Wrestling abandoned the tag team championship in 1979 and two years later the promotion closed. While it is possible that there were shorter reigns, the seven-day reign of the Great Mephisto and Kinji Shibuya in April 1973 is the shortest documented title reign. The Blonde Bombers's (Ray Stevens and Pat Patterson) reign that started in April 1965 was the longest reign on record, a total of 623 days.

Title history
Key

NWA San Francisco history

Big Time Wrestling history

Team reigns by combined length
Key

Individual reigns by combined length
Key

1977 Championship Tournament

See also
 National Wrestling Alliance
 NWA World Tag Team Championship

Footnotes

Concurrent championships
Sources for 13 simultaneous NWA World Tag Team Championships
 NWA World Tag Team Championship (Los Angeles version)
 NWA World Tag Team Championship (San Francisco version)
 NWA World Tag Team Championship (Central States version)
 NWA World Tag Team Championship (Chicago version)
 NWA World Tag Team Championship (Buffalo Athletic Club version)
 NWA World Tag Team Championship (Georgia version)
 NWA World Tag Team Championship (Iowa/Nebraska version)
 NWA World Tag Team Championship (Indianapolis version)
 NWA World Tag Team Championship (Salt Lake Wrestling Club version)
 NWA World Tag Team Championship (Amarillo version)
 NWA World Tag Team Championship (Minneapolis version)
 NWA World Tag Team Championship (Texas version)
 NWA World Tag Team Championship (Mid-America version)

References

Big Time Wrestling (San Francisco) championships
National Wrestling Alliance championships
NWA San Francisco championships
Tag team wrestling championships
World professional wrestling championships